Fr. Jazep Hermanovich MIC (also Yazep Germanovich, Belarusian Latin alphabet: Jazep Hermanovič;  (sometimes also spelled Германовіч), 4 March 1890 - 26 December 1978) was a Belarusian Eastern Catholic priest, poet and Gulag survivor.

Early life

Hermanovich was born in Halshany into a Belarusian Roman Catholic peasant family. He studied at schools in Halshany and Ashmiany.

In 1913, he graduated from a Catholic seminary in Vilnius and was ordained priest.

Work in West Belarus

In 1921, he became a member of the Society of the Belarusian School, an organization promoting Belarusian-language education in West Belarus which was then part of the Second Polish Republic and where ethnic Belarusians faced active polonization by the Polish state. For some time, he held Belarusian language services at the Church of St. Nicholas in Vilnius (then Wilno).

In 1924, Hermanovich joined the Congregation of Marian Fathers. He moved to the town of Druja where he was part of the community of Belarusian Marian Priests which was influential among Belarusian Catholics in interwar Poland.

While in Druja, Hermanovich started publishing his literary works under the pseudonym Vincuk Advažny (Vincuk the Brave).

Missionary work in Harbin, Gulag captivity

In 1932, Hermanovich was sent to Harbin, China, to do missionary work among the community of Harbin Russians with the Russian Catholic Apostolic Exarchate of Harbin. He was head of the Catholic Lyceum of St Nicolas in Harbin, taking care of Russian orphans who lost their parents in the Russian Civil War.

In 1936, Hermanovich returned to Poland because of health reasons. In 1938, he and other Belarusian Marian fathers were deported from Druja to central Poland as part of a wave of repressions by the Polish state against Belarusian national activists. After this, Hermanovich returned to Harbin.

In 1948, Hermanovich was arrested by the communist Chinese authorities and handed over to the Soviet NKVD. After several months of interrogations and tortures, Hermanovich and other teachers of the Marian lyceum of Harbin were sentenced to 25 years of incarceration and labour in the Gulag concentration camps. Hermanovich was deported to concentration camps near Tayshet and then near Bratsk. While in the Gulag, Hermanovich held secret religious services among other inmates.

Emigration to the United Kingdom

After Stalin's death in 1953, Hermanovich was released and as a former Polish citizen deported to communist Poland in 1955. From there he was able to move to the Vatican and then to London where he joined the community of Belarusian Catholic priests (Ceslaus Sipovic, Leo Haroshka, Alexander Nadson and others) who had settled there after the Second World War.

Since 1960, Father Hermanovich resided at the Marian House in North Finchley, London, until his death on 26 December 1978. He is buried at St. Pancras and Islington Cemetery along with his Marian confreres. While living in London, Hermanovich was teaching at St Cyril of Turau Belarusian school and was also an editor-in-chief of the Belarusian emigre Catholic journal Božym šlacham, sent to subscribers all over the world. In London he published a number of literary works as well as translated the Book of Psalms.

See also
 Church of St Cyril of Turau and All the Patron Saints of the Belarusian People
 Alexander Nadson
 Ceslaus Sipovic

External links
 Selected works online (in Belarusian)
 Memoirs by Fr. Jazep Hermanovich - audio (in Belarusian)

Literary works

 Як Казюк сабраўся да споведзі (How Kaziuk prepared for the confession), Vilnius, 1928; Minsk, 2011
 Казюковае жанімства (Kaziuk’s wedding), Vilnius, 1929
 Як Гануля зьбіралася ў Аргентыну (How Hanula prepared to go to Argentina), Vilnius, 1930. 
 Адам і Анелька (Adam and Anelka), Vilnius, 1931
 Канёк-Гарбунок (The Little Humpbacked Horse, adaptation of the tale by Pyotr Pavlovich Yershov), Vilnius, 1932. 
 Бэтлейка (The batleyka), Vilnius, 1932. 
 Унія на Палесьсі (The Church Union in Polesia), Albercin, 1932; Brest, 2004 
 Беларускія цымбалы (The Belarusian cymbalo), Vilnius, 1933
 Казка аб рыбаку і рыбцы (The tale of the fisher and the fish), Vilnius, 1935. 
 Хлапец (The boy), Vilnius, 1935. 
 Гануліны клопаты (Hanula’s worries), Vilnius, 1935. 
 Кітай-Сібір-Масква (China - Siberia - Moscow (memories)), Munich, 1962; Minsk-St. Petersburg, 2003 
 Пакутныя псальмы (Penitential Psalms, versed translation), Rome, 1964. 
 Przeżyłem sowieckie łagry. Wspomnienia (I survived the Soviet concentration camps. Memoirs), 1966
 Князь і лапаць. Сучасная казка (The king and the bast shoe), London, 1964. 
 Байкі і іншыя вершы (Fables and other verses), London, 1973.
 Выбраныя творы (Selected Works), Minsk, 2011

References

1890 births
1978 deaths
People from Ashmyany District
People from Oshmyansky Uyezd
Belarusian Eastern Catholic priests
Belarusian poets
Belarusian educators
Gulag detainees
20th-century Eastern Catholic clergy
Congregation of Marian Fathers of the Immaculate Conception
History of Christianity in China
Burials at St Pancras and Islington Cemetery